= Acinula =

Scientific classification
- Domain: Eukaryota
- Kingdom: Fungi
- Division: Ascomycota
- Genus: Acinula; Fr.
- Species: A. candicans

Binomial name
- Acinula candicans Fr.

Genus of fungi

Acinula is a monotypic genus of fungus with unknown classification. The only species is Acinula candicans.

The species was described by Elias Magnus Fries in 1822.
